The Uptown Monotones are an Austrian experimental/fusion band that formed in Graz in 1993. They became known to a wider audience through the talent show Die große Chance.

Discography

Albums  

2005 The Uptown Monotones (Ginkgo Tree Music)
2013 Criminals (Ginkgo Tree Music)
2014 Fragments In A Frame (Ginkgo Tree Music)

EPs/Singles 
2012 Dust In The Air ft. Jimi D. (Ginkgo Tree Music)

References

External links 
 

Austrian rock music groups